Terry McGregor (born 5 July 1977 in Sydney) is an Australian former cricket player.

She played 46 matches for the New South Wales Breakers in the Women's National Cricket League.

McGregor played four Tests and 26 One Day Internationals for the Australia national women's cricket team. She is the 89th woman to be capped for Australia in One Day Internationals, and the 139th woman to play Test Cricket for Australia.

References

Living people
1977 births
Australia women Test cricketers
Australia women One Day International cricketers
New South Wales Breakers cricketers